Jack Weldon Israel (April 3, 1934 – September 17, 2017) was an American basketball player who was drafted by the New York Knicks in the 14th round of the 1959 NBA draft from Southwest Missouri State University. He attended the University of Missouri for his freshman year (1951–52) before joining the Navy. After his military commitment, he returned to Springfield, Missouri and finished his college basketball career at Missouri State.

In his post-basketball career he became a teacher, coach, counselor, assistant principal, principal, assistant superintendent, superintendent, and college professor.

References

External links
 Jack Israel obituary

1934 births
2017 deaths
American men's basketball players
Basketball players from Missouri
High school basketball coaches in the United States
Missouri State Bears basketball players
Missouri Tigers men's basketball players
New York Knicks draft picks
Sportspeople from Springfield, Missouri
University of Illinois alumni
University of California, Los Angeles alumni